Manila Cathedral School is a basic education institution in Tondo, Manila.

History 
During the pre-war years, the Manila Cathedral School of Intramuros had a famous "Tiples" all boys choir trained in sacred music. These boys came from different provinces and enjoyed free board and scholarship at the Colegio de Tiples.

After the 1945 liberation, the Manila Cathedral and the school for the Tiples were left into runs but the Archbishop of Manila, Most Rev. Michael O'Doherty, D.D. was not disheartened. Foremost in his mind was the education of these young boys. The school was transferred to the present site of Manila Cathedral School in Tayuman, Tondo, known before as the "Instituto de Mujeres" co-owned by Doña Rosa Sevilla's family and the Archdiocese of Manila. When the Instituto de Mujeres decided to transfer in Governor Forbes St., Manila, the Archdiocese of Manila purchased the entire lot thus became the sole owner. For the time, this area served to house different religious congregations.

In 1949, the archbishop called all the diocesan priests with education degrees. They agreed to establish the school for Tiples and for boys who have vocation to the priesthood and classes to commence in June 1949; to name the school Manila cathedral School and to offer slots for kindergarten up to 4th year high school.

Thus, Manila Cathedral School was born with about 400 students paying only minimal tuition fee,exclusively for the poor boys of Tondo. In 1950s, Manila Cathedral School opened its doors to female students.

In 1978, Archbishop of Manila Jaime Cardinal Sin invited the Congregation of the Religious Missionaries of St. Dominic (Order of Preachers) to run the school.

In 1997, the 10th MCS Directress & Principal, Sr. Maria Esperanza H. Seguban, O.P., started the tertiary level, thus making MCS as Manila Cathedral College. However, in 2001, the School Board instead decided to concentrate on the Basic Education.

After 21 years of administration, the Dominican Sisters returned MCS administration to the archdiocese under the supervision of the School Board Char Most Rev. Teodoro Bacani, Jr. D.D., Auxiliary Bishop of Manila. In 2001, The Manila Cathedral College again became Manila Cathedral School.

In 2002, Msgr. Claro Matt Garcia became the 12th School Director, Principal and Chaplain of McS. Under his tenure he renovated and modernized the Offices and Facilities of the school, such as the introduction of air-conditioned classrooms. He also expanded the scholarship program for poor children. To give full attention to the development of the school, he invited Dr. Jesusa Bulotano to be the school principal of the school - the first time since 1978 for the school to have a separate director and principal. The tenure of Msgr. Claro Matt Garcia saw the construction of several buildings; Some of the buildings include a better gymnasium, canteen and improved computer and science laboratories.

In 2014, Manila Cathedral School became a member of the RCAMES North Manila Cluster School together with Espiritu Santo Parochial School, Holy Child Catholic School, St. Joseph School, San Rafael Parochial School, and San Pablo Apostol Learning Center. Rev. Fr. Nolan A. Que, Ph.D., the head of Curriculum and Instruction System of RCAMES was appointed as the cluster school Director and Fr. Nicanor A. Celiano Jr. as the cluster school Assistant Director. It was in his tenure that the school was granted the PAASCU Level 1 Accreditation.

Directors and principals

References 

 Clusters 5 & 6 Student Handbook, Manila: 2018
 Manila Cathedral School Revised Student Handbook, Manila: 2017

External links
 Official Website
 MCS Hymn "Cathedral Beloved"

Roman Catholic Archdiocese of Manila Educational System
Catholic elementary schools in Metro Manila
Education in Tondo, Manila
Educational institutions established in 1949
1949 establishments in the Philippines
Catholic secondary schools in Metro Manila